Andrija Živković (born 11 July 1996) is a Serbian professional footballer who plays as a winger for Greek Super League club PAOK and the Serbia national team. 

He is the youngest player ever to make a senior appearance for Serbia, as well as the youngest Partizan captain in the club's history. 

Živković was a vital member of the Serbia national under-20 team that won the 2015 FIFA U-20 World Cup, scoring two goals and providing two assists.

Club career

Partizan
Živković joined Partizan in September 2009. He was a member of the club's promising generation, alongside Danilo Pantić and Nemanja Radonjić, among others.

2012–13 season
Živković made his competitive debut for their first team in a league fixture against Novi Pazar on 28 April 2013, replacing Darko Brašanac after 65 minutes of the match that ended in a goalless draw. That was his only appearance in the 2012–13 campaign, as the club won its sixth consecutive championship title.

2013–14 season
After a long negotiation, Živković signed his first professional contract with Partizan on 23 August 2013, on a three-year deal. He scored his first competitive goal for the club only two days later, after coming on as a substitute for Nikola Ninković in a 5–1 home victory over Radnički Kragujevac. Afterwards, Živković scored a goal in the next three league games, in a 3–1 home win over Rad, in a 2–1 away win against Sloboda Užice, as well as in a 2–0 home victory over OFK Beograd.

On 4 March 2014, Živković became Partizan's youngest captain of all-time at 17 years, 7 months and 18 days. This honour was previously held by Nikola Ninković, who captained the team at 17 years, 10 months and 12 days. In his first full senior season, Živković made a total of 25 appearances in all competitions and scored five goals.

2014–15 season
In his third senior season, Živković played regularly since the beginning of the campaign, despite being unable to score in any competition. He also appeared in five games of the UEFA Europa League group stage. After failing to find the back of the net for several months, he scored his first goal of the season in a 5–1 home league win over Borac Čačak on 7 December 2014. He improved his tally after the winter break by scoring four more league goals, including a brace in a 3–1 away victory over OFK Beograd on 13 April 2015. In total, Živković made 40 appearances in all competitions and scored seven goals, as the club won the championship title.

2015–16 season
After missing the majority of the team's pre-season schedule due to national team duty, Živković made his first appearance of the season in a 1–0 home win over Dila Gori in the first leg of the UEFA Champions League second qualifying round on 14 July 2015. He entered the field as a 60th-minute substitute for Aboubakar Oumarou, managing to earn a free kick in the 81st minute, which would eventually result in the game-winning goal. On 17 July 2014, Živković scored once in the league's opener versus Metalac Gornji Milanovac, as the game ended 4–0. He then scored his first goal for the club in UEFA competitions, finding the back of the net in a 4–2 home victory over Steaua București on 5 August 2015. He also provided an assist in the game and helped Partizan reach the Champions League play-off round.

On 17 September, Živković scored a goal and provided an assist in a 3–2 home victory over AZ in the opening round of the Europa League group stage. He subsequently scored a brace in a 3–1 away win against Augsburg on 1 October. In the fifth round of the group stage, Živković continued his goal scoring form, netting the winning goal against AZ in a 2–1 away victory on 26 November.

On 4 February 2016, Živković was suspended from the first team for refusing to extend his contract with the club.

Benfica
On 5 July 2016, Živković signed a five-year deal with Portuguese champions S.L. Benfica. He was signed on a free transfer after his contract with Partizan had expired. He was given the number 17 shirt. On 2 October he was given his Benfica debut, coming on in the 84th minute for Gonçalo Guedes. He made his UEFA Champions League debut five months later in a 4–0 away loss to Borussia Dortmund. He ended the season winning the league title with Benfica, having scored no goals in 15 league appearances. In total, he appeared in 24 games and scored one goal in the national cup.

Živković played his first Benfica match of the 2017–18 season against Rio Ave.

PAOK
On 8 September 2020, PAOK announced the signing of Živković on a free transfer. The 24-year-old Serbian international was previously released by Benfica as part of their summer overhaul and PAOK snapped him up on a two-year contract for an undisclosed fee. He made 88 appearances for Benfica, scoring four goals and contributing 24 assists. In his first official game for PAOK he scored a goal against his previous team Benfica, which as a result missed the Champions League play-offs. On 15 September 2020, Živković scored the winning goal as PAOK secured a berth in the UEFA Champions League play-off round after defeating his former club Benfica in Thessaloniki 2–1 in the 3rd qualifying round. On 5 November 2020, he scored a brace in a 4-1 home win 2020–21 UEFA Europa League group stage game against PSV Eindhoven helping PAOK to increase the possibility of qualifying for the next phase of the UEFA Europa League.  Among some other highlights, on 29 April 2021, helped his club to seal qualification to the Greek Cup final with a spectacular lob in extra time, forming a 2-1 home win game against rivals AEK Athens.  Zivkovic won the Greek Cup, his first trophy with PAOK, after helping his team win the final against Olympiacos with 1-2, giving a high class assist to one of his teammates on the 90th minute.

On 30 October 2021, Andrija agreed to a three-year contract extension for an annual fee in the excess of €1,000,000, which will keep tied with the club until the summer of 2024.  On 9 December, he opened the score  with a header, in a 2-0 UEFA Europa Conference League home win game against Lincoln Red Imps F.C., sealing the qualification of the club in the phase of Knockout round play-offs, for the first time in the last five years.

International career

Živković was a key member of the Serbia national under-17 team in two UEFA European Under-17 Championship qualification cycles, but failed to help them reach the final tournament on both occasions. He subsequently received his first call-up for the senior national team by manager Siniša Mihajlović, following his performances at club level. On 11 October 2013, Živković became the youngest player ever to debut for Serbia, aged 17, after coming on as a substitute for Zoran Tošić in a 2–0 home friendly win over Japan.

Subsequently, Živković took part at the 2014 UEFA European Under-19 Championship. He appeared in the opening two games of the tournament, before leaving the team upon his club's decision. Serbia were eventually eliminated by Portugal after a penalty shoot-out in the semi-final of the competition.

Likewise, Živković was selected to represent his country at the 2015 FIFA U-20 World Cup. He played in all of his team's seven games, as they won the gold medal. Furthermore, Živković managed to score on two occasions, including a direct free kick against Mexico, eventually being voted as the tournament's best goal.

Senior team
Živković made his debut for the Serbia national football team on 11 October 2013, becoming the youngest player in the history of Serbian team to make a debut. 

In June 2018, Živković was included in the final 23-man squad for the 2018 FIFA World Cup, where he appeared in a match against Brazil.

In November 2022, he was selected in Serbia's squad for the 2022 FIFA World Cup in Qatar. He played in all three group stage matches, against Brazil, Cameroon, and Switzerland. He provided two assists in a group stage match against Cameroon, which ended in a 3-3 draw.  Serbia finished fourth in the group.

Career statistics

Club

Notes

International

Scores and results list Serbia's goal tally first, score column indicates score after each Živković goal.

Honours
Partizan
 Serbian SuperLiga: 2012–13, 2014–15
 Serbian Cup: 2015–16

Benfica
Primeira Liga: 2016–17, 2018–19
Taça de Portugal: 2016–17

PAOK 
Greek Cup: 2020–21 

Serbia
 FIFA U-20 World Cup: 2015

Individual
 Sportsperson of the Year of Niš (2015)

References

External links

Serbia national team official page

1996 births
Living people
Sportspeople from Niš
Serbian footballers
Association football midfielders
FK Partizan players
Serbian SuperLiga players
Serbia youth international footballers
Serbia under-21 international footballers
Serbia international footballers
S.L. Benfica footballers
Primeira Liga players
PAOK FC players
Super League Greece players
Serbian expatriate footballers
Expatriate footballers in Portugal
Expatriate footballers in Greece
Serbian expatriate sportspeople in Portugal
Serbian expatriate sportspeople in Greece
2018 FIFA World Cup players
2022 FIFA World Cup players